The Remix Collection is a 1995 remix LP for R&B group Boyz II Men, issued by Motown Records. Released against the group's wishes, it began a chain of events that led to the eventual dissolution of Boyz II Men's relationship with Motown.

Track listing

International edition 
The album was produced by Dallas Austin and Jheryl Busby.
"Countdown Interlude" / "Under Pressure (Dallas Austin Mix)" / "Sympin' Interlude"
"Vibin' (The New Flava)" (ft. Treach, Craig Mack, Busta Rhymes and Method Man)
" I Remember" / "Motownphilly Interlude"
"Water Runs Dry (Strat Mix)"
"U Know (Dallas Austin Mix)"
"I'll Make Love to You (Make Love to You Version)" / "Motownphilly Interlude"
"Uhh, Ahh (Dedication Mix)"
"Motownphilly (Quiet Storm Version)"
"On Bended Knee (Human Rhythm Mix)"
"Brokenhearted (Soulpower Groove Mix)" (ft. Wanya Morris, Brandy and Sheree Ford Payne)
"Thank You (Moog Flava Mix)" 
"Sympin' (Dallas Austin Mix)"

US edition 
The album was produced by Dallas Austin and Jheryl Busby.
"Countdown Interlude" / "Under Pressure (Dallas Austin Mix)" / "Sympin' Interlude"
"Vibin' (The New Flava)" (ft. Treach, Craig Mack, Busta Rhymes and Method Man)
" I Remember" / "Motownphilly Interlude"
"Water Runs Dry (Strat Mix)"
"U Know (Dallas Austin Mix)"
"Hey, Lover" (LL Cool J (ft. Boyz II Men)
"I'll Make Love to You (Make Love to You Version)" / "Motownphilly Interlude"
"Uhh, Ahh (Dedication Mix)"
"Motownphilly (Quiet Storm Version)"
"On Bended Knee (Human Rhythm Mix)"
"Brokenhearted (Soulpower Groove Mix)" (ft. Wanya Morris, Brandy and Sheree Ford Payne)
"Sympin' (Dallas Austin Mix)"

Charts

Weekly charts

Year-end charts

Certifications

References 

Boyz II Men compilation albums
Albums produced by Tim & Bob
Albums produced by Dallas Austin
1995 remix albums
Motown remix albums